The National Olympic Committee of the Union of Soviet Socialist Republics was the government-funded organization representing the Soviet Union in the International Olympic Committee. The NOC USSR organized Soviet participation at the Summer and Winter Olympic Games. The International Olympic Committee recognized the NOC USSR on 7 May 1951 at the 45th session of the IOC. Prior to the 1950s, the Soviet Union was internationally banned due to the left-radical Bolshevik coup-d'état (October Revolution) and the Red terror.

Presidents

Soviet members of the International Olympic Committee

See also
 Soviet Union at the Olympics
 Russian Olympic Committee

Sources

Former National Olympic Committees

Soviet
Olympic